November Theatre is a Canadian theatre company that started in Edmonton, Alberta but is now based in Vancouver, British Columbia. The company's Artistic Producer is Michael Scholar, Jr.

History 
The company was founded in 1998 by Corinne Kessel of the band Los Furios and Michael Scholar Jr. Their first production was world English premiere of the expressionist operetta The Black Rider at the Edmonton International Fringe Festival. The Black Rider was created through the collaboration of singer-songwriter Tom Waits, William S. Burroughs, and avant-garde stage director Robert Wilson. In 1999 the were invited to bring The Black Rider to the New York Fringe Fringe Festival where it won the festival award for “Best Direction”.

In 2010 November Theatre went on to produce the stage adaptation of Hard Core Logo, the Bruce McDonald film and Michael Turner book. Joe "Shithead" Keithley of D.O.A. composed new music for the show called "Hard Core Logo: Live". The script was written by Founding Artistic Producer Michael Scholar, Jr.  The production premiered at Theatre Network in Edmonton in 2010 before touring to the PuSh Festival in Vancouver in 2011.

Touring history
November Theatre's production went on to tour Canada in 2004–2005 with presentations at Theatre Network in Edmonton, Ground Zero Theatre and the Calgary Opera, Persephone Theatre in Saskatoon, Yukon Arts Centre in Whitehorse, Intrepid Theatre in Victoria and the PuSh International Performing Arts Festival in Vancouver.  The production went on to win 6 Elizabeth Sterling Haynes Awards in Edmonton and 6 Betty Mitchell Awards in Calgary including "Best Production" and "Best Direction" in both major centres. In 2006 the production was presented at the Magnetic North Theatre Festival in St. John's Newfoundland. The production was remounted in Vancouver, January/February 2008 for the Arts Club Theatre Company and the PuSh Festival and then in 2009 for the Tarragon Theatre in Toronto.

References

External links
 November Theatre's official website

Theatre companies in Alberta
Theatre in Edmonton
Theatre in Vancouver
Theatre companies in British Columbia